di Antonio is an Italian surname. Notable people with this name include the following:

Surname
Antonello di Giovanni di Antonio, birthname of Antonello da Messina, (c. 1430 – February 1479), Italian painter

Second name
Filippo di Antonio Filippelli (1460–1506), Italian painter
Francesco di Antonio del Chierico (1433–1484), Italian manuscript illuminator
Vincenzo di Antonio Frediani (fl. 1481 - 1504), Italian painter

See also

D'Antonio
Dantonio
Emile de Antonio